Naseeb Dawlatzai is an Afghan cricketer. He made his first-class debut for Speen Ghar Region in the 2018 Ahmad Shah Abdali 4-day Tournament on 8 April 2018.

References

External links
 

Year of birth missing (living people)
Living people
Afghan cricketers
Spin Ghar Tigers cricketers
Place of birth missing (living people)